In music composition, fragmentation  is the use of fragments or the "division of a musical idea (gesture, motive, theme, etc.) into segments". It is used in tonal and atonal music, and is a common method of localized development and closure.

Fragmentation is related to Arnold Schoenberg's concept of liquidation, a common compositional technique that describes the reduction of a large-scale musical idea to its essential form (such as a contour line, a specific harmonic motion, or the like). Liquidation shapes much thematically-driven music, such as that by Béla Bartók, Stravinsky, and Schoenberg himself. It is important to understand that, although they are related, fragmentation and liquidation are separate processes and concepts.

Further reading
Caplin, William. Classical Form: A Theory of Formal Functions, p. 10-11.

References

Music theory